A neck rein is a type of indirect rein aid. The horse responds to a neck rein when it has learned that a light pressure of the right rein against its neck on that side means for the horse to turn left, and vice versa.

The neck rein is used in both English riding and in Western riding, though the style differs between the disciplines.

In both disciplines, the horse should look in the direction it is going. Head tossing and turning the head to the outside of the turn are clear signs of bad training and/or faulty rider technique.  Moving the hand slightly to the left brings the rein into contact on the right side of the horse's neck, and the horse learns to turn left, away from the pressure.  Likewise, moving the hand to the right means for the horse to turn right. A horse that has been well trained to neck rein becomes so responsive to legs and seat that it is possible to take the bridle off completely a move sometime seen in non-competitive exhibitions.

Young horses are first taught to respond to a direct rein, with reins held in both of the rider's hands, turning the horse's head by tightening the rein on the side of the desired turn.  The correct way to teach neck reining relies on perfecting the horse's responses to weight and leg aids while slowly using less direct rein pressure and introducing the feel of the rein against the neck as a cue.  A young horse in training needs a reminder from time to time to look where it is going, but horses learn to neck rein fairly quickly, if trained properly. Occasionally trainers will use sloppy and incorrect methods such as crossing the reins under the neck or using reins with tacks or pins in them, but this poor level of horsemanship is thankfully not seen as often in western riding today as it was in years past.  

When riding in the Western style, riders hold both reins in the left hand (if they are right-handed).  This was historically so that they could hold a lariat or other needed tool in their right hand. The reins are kept relaxed and somewhat loose.  In western pleasure competition at horse shows, riders are not supposed to ever to take the slack out of the reins when neck-reining, and even cues to slow or stop must be very subtle.  For working horses, a relaxed rein allows the animal freedom to move over rough terrain. There is some slack in the reins unless the rider needs to tell the horse to stop.

For polo and polocrosse the rider holds one or two pairs of reins in one hand.  Slack in the reins is not required.

In English riding and other systems where the primary means of communication is light pressure between the rider's hands and the horse's mouth, light pressure is always maintained on the bit.  The neck rein in English riding is used in addition to a direct rein and reinforces certain riding aids, particularly turns that require the horse to set back on its haunches, such as turns at high speeds when show jumping in a timed jump-off, or in events such as Dressage when performing a Pirouette. Many well-trained English horses seem to already know how to neck rein without being formally taught — further proof that the skill is primarily an outcome of encouraging responsiveness to the legs, weight and a light hand.

Riding techniques and movements